Charles Richmond Henderson (1848–1915) was an American Baptist minister and sociologist. After being a pastor for nearly 20 years in Terre Haute and Detroit, he took an appointment as an assistant professor of sociology at the University of Chicago, where he became a tenured professor. He published several works on society in the United States, the prison system, and the sociology of charities.

Biography
Born in Covington, Indiana, on December 17, 1848, he graduated at the Old University of Chicago with a Bachelor of Arts degree 1870 and a Master of Arts degree in 1873. He earned his Bachelor of Divinity degree at the Baptist Union Theological Seminary in 1873 and was ordained as a minister.

Appointed in 1892 assistant professor of sociology at the University of Chicago, he was afterward advanced to a full professorship.  In 1898-99 he was president of the National Conference of Charities, in 1902 president of the National Prison Association, and in 1910 of the International Prison Congress.  In 1907 he served as secretary of the Illinois Commission on Occupational Diseases.

He died in Charleston, South Carolina, on March 29, 1915.

Publications
His works include:  
 The Development of Doctrine in the Epistles (1894)
 The Social Spirit in America (1896)
 Social Settlements (1897)
 Social Elements (1898)
 An Introduction to the Study of the Dependent, Defective, and Delinquent Classes (1898; second edition, enlarged, 1901)
 Modern Prison Systems (57th Congress, 2d Session, House Document No. 452, 1903)
 Modern Methods of Charity (1904)
 Industrial Insurance in the United States (1907)
 Social Duties from a Christian Point of View (1909)
 Education in Relation to Sex (1909)
 Social Programmes of the West (1913)

See also
 Chautauqua
 Social Gospel

References

Footnotes

Bibliography

External links

 Guide to the Charles Richmond Henderson Papers 1902-1910 at the University of Chicago Special Collections Research Center

American Christian clergy
American political writers
American male non-fiction writers
American socialists
Writers from Chicago
Writers from Detroit
Writers from Terre Haute, Indiana
University of Chicago faculty
1848 births
1915 deaths
People from Covington, Indiana
Clergy from Detroit